James Byeram Owens (c. 1816 – August 1, 1889) was a slaveowner and American politician who served as a Deputy from Florida to the Provisional Congress of the Confederate States from 1861 to 1862. He mounted legal arguments in defense of secession based on an originalist interpretation of the U.S. Constitution and Southern arguments in favor of states' rights, with the intention of protecting the practice and institution of slavery.

Biography 
Owens was born in Fairfield County, South Carolina, moving to Mississippi and later to Marion County, Florida, in 1857, with two of his brothers. Owens was one of the wealthier slaveowning planters in Marion County. His name appears on the 1860 Slave Census Schedules for Marion County which attribute to him the ownership of 89 enslaved persons. Owens used the forced labor of enslaved people to work the land on his plantation, where cotton was grown.

Owens served as a delegate from Florida at the Democratic National Conventions of 1860. At the first convention, held in Charleston, he was selected to represent the interests of Southern Democrats in a debate with Benjamin Butler of Massachusetts. Owens, along with the Florida delegation and several other entire delegations representing the Southern states, walked out of the Charleston convention and held their own convention, where they nominated John C. Breckinridge for the Democratic Party ticket in the U.S. presidential election of 1860.

Owens then represented Marion County at the Secession Convention of Florida held in Tallahassee in January 1861 and was a signatory to the Ordinance of Secession which declared Florida's secession from the United States. Shortly thereafter, Florida joined the Confederacy and Owens became a Deputy in the Provisional Congress of the Confederate States as well as a signatory to the Constitution of the Confederate States, representing Florida.

After the war, Owens, along with all other former Confederates, was granted a full and unconditional pardon by President Andrew Johnson in 1868.

Notable relatives 
Owens was the brother-in-law of Ethelbert Barksdale and the maternal grandfather of John W. Martin, the 24th Governor of Florida, by way of his daughter, Willie Owens, and her husband, John M. Martin Jr., himself the son of John Marshall Martin.

See also
 List of people pardoned or granted clemency by the president of the United States

References

 

1816 births
1889 deaths
19th-century American politicians
19th-century Baptist ministers from the United States
Burials in Florida
Deputies and delegates to the Provisional Congress of the Confederate States
Farmers from South Carolina
People from Fairfield County, South Carolina
People of Florida in the American Civil War
Recipients of American presidential pardons
Signers of the Confederate States Constitution
Signers of the Provisional Constitution of the Confederate States
